Clivina ovalipennis is a species of ground beetle in the subfamily Scaritinae. It was described by Sloane in 1905.

References

ovalipennis
Beetles described in 1905